"Blue Orchid" is the first track by the American alternative rock band the White Stripes from their album Get Behind Me Satan, and the first single to be released from the album. Although it was suspected that Jack White wrote the song about his breakup with Renée Zellweger, he has denied this claim. Lyrically, "Blue Orchid" is about White's longing for classical entertainment industries and the turmoil that the newer industries sent him through.

"Blue Orchid" was released to US rock radio on April 18, 2005. Commercially, the song topped the Canadian Singles Chart in June 2005 and reached the top 10 in the United Kingdom, peaking at number nine on the UK Singles Chart the same month. In the United States, the song reached number 43 on the Billboard Hot 100 and number seven on the Modern Rock Tracks chart. Elsewhere, the song was a top-twenty hit in Denmark and Norway. The music video, directed by Floria Sigismondi, was ranked number 21 on Yahoo!'s list of the "Top 25 Spookiest Videos" in 2005.

Background
The recorded sound is produced by playing a guitar into an Electro-Harmonix creation, the Polyphonic Octave Generator (POG). Live, the sound is produced by a bass-rich guitar tone, used in combination with Whammy Pedal and the POG to create the heavily metallic sounding breaks of the song ("How dare you, how old are you now anyway" and "get behind me, get behind me now anyway").

The single comes in three editions, each with different additional tracks.  All three covers feature two people dressed up as the White Stripes, but are noticeably different people. The first CD and the 7-inch feature the couple in the same order as Get Behind Me Satan, with "Jack" on the right. The second CD version features "Jack" on the left.

In an NPR interview, Jack White referred to "Blue Orchid" as the song that saved the album. He has denied that the song relates to the ending of his relationship with Renée Zellweger.

Music video
The video for "Blue Orchid" was ranked on Yahoo!'s "Top 25 Spookiest Videos" ranking in 2005, charting at number 21. It features Karen Elson, a model who would marry Jack White soon after the shoot. The video, which was directed by Floria Sigismondi, ends with a horse, its hooves raised in the air, about to stomp on Elson, but just before the hooves land on her, the video quickly goes black, ending.

Track listings

US and UK 7-inch single
A. "Blue Orchid"
B. "The Nurse"

US maxi-CD single
 "Blue Orchid"
 "Who's a Big Baby?"
 "Though I Hear You Calling, I Will Not Answer"
 "You've Got Her in Your Pocket" (live)
 Track 4 was recorded live in Belfast, Northern Ireland, on August 25, 2004.

UK CD1
 "Blue Orchid"
 "Though I Hear You Calling, I Will Not Answer"

UK CD2
 "Blue Orchid"
 "Who's a Big Baby?"
 "You've Got Her in Your Pocket" (live)
 Track 3 was recorded live in Belfast, Northern Ireland, on August 25, 2004.

Charts and certifications

Weekly charts

Year-end charts

Certifications

Release history

Covers and remixes
"Blue Orchid" has been remixed by High Contrast on the album Fabric Live 25. It is the first track on the second disc of the album. It features the main guitar riff accompanied by a largely drum and bass inspired backing beat. The vocals from the song, "You took a white orchid, you took a white orchid and turned it blue" are repeated at various points throughout the track.

In popular culture

The song is used as the theme song for the Australian Radio Show Wil & Lehmo on Triple M; it is also used briefly in the trailer for the 2008 documentary  It Might Get Loud, in which Jack White features with other musical artists The Edge and Jimmy Page. The song can also be heard in the movie, The Green Hornet, which is directed by Michel Gondry who also directed many other music videos for the White Stripes. Part of the song is also played in the second episode of Forces of Nature, a 2016 science documentary series aired on BBC One. The song was also briefly used in the Hulu miniseries adaption of Looking for Alaska.

The song is also playable in the music video game Guitar Hero 5.

The song is featured in the trailer for the fifth season of the animated comedy Rick and Morty.

References

2005 singles
2005 songs
Canadian Singles Chart number-one singles
Music videos directed by Floria Sigismondi
Punk blues songs
Songs written by Jack White
The White Stripes songs
XL Recordings singles